Johnny Lance Davis (born September 1, 1976, in Winter Haven, Florida) is a former Major League Baseball starting pitcher. He last played in 2008 for the Long Island Ducks of the independent Atlantic League. He is the career wins leader for the Ducks with 28 wins.

Davis was drafted by the Cincinnati Reds in the 16th round of the  draft. He made his professional debut with the Princeton Reds. In 15 games, he had a 3–7 record with a 3.88 earned run average. Davis started 20 games for the Reds in 2001, going 8–4. After the  season, Davis became a free agent, but re-signed with the Reds. He split the year between the Double-A Chattanooga Lookouts and Triple-A Louisville Bats. Again a free agent after the season, he signed with the Long Island Ducks.

Davis pitched well enough with the Ducks to have his contract purchased by the New York Yankees on August 2, . He appeared in 8 games for the Triple-A Columbus Clippers before being released by the Yankees a month and a half after they purchased his contract. In , he again pitched for the Ducks, recording a 3.76 ERA and being elected to the Atlantic League All-star game.

On January 2, Davis signed with the Detroit Tigers. He played for Single-A Lakeland, Double-A Erie, and Triple-A Toledo. In , Davis started his third stint with the Ducks, going 9–4 in 18 games. On July 31, Davis signed with the Ducks for a fourth stint.

External links
, or Retrosheet, or Pura Pelota (VPBL stats), or Long Island Ducks (profile), or The 2007 Toledo Mud Hens team starting to take shape...

1976 births
Living people
Baseball players from Florida
Billings Mustangs players
Burlington Bees players
Charleston AlleyCats players
Chattanooga Lookouts players
Cincinnati Reds players
Columbus Clippers players
Criollos de Caguas players
Erie SeaWolves players
Indios de Mayagüez players
Lakeland Tigers players
Leones del Caracas players
American expatriate baseball players in Venezuela
Leones del Escogido players
American expatriate baseball players in the Dominican Republic
Liga de Béisbol Profesional Roberto Clemente pitchers
Long Island Ducks players
Louisville Bats players
Louisville RiverBats players
Major League Baseball pitchers
People from Winter Haven, Florida
Princeton Reds players
Rockford Reds players
Sportspeople from Lakeland, Florida
Toledo Mud Hens players